Upper Thames Rowing Club is an English rowing club. It has a large clubhouse at Remenham in Berkshire, on the River Thames near the town of Henley-on-Thames and is set back by its lawn frontage from the first half of the course of Henley Royal Regatta. The club was established in 1963.

History
In 1964 the club entered its first crew for Henley Royal Regatta in the Thames Cup. The crew was composed of:
 Kevin O' Sullivan at bow (Eton Excelsior)
     Alan Smiter (also Eton Excelsior and the Club's first captain)
     Bill Rawson (Reading R.C.)
     Charles Hawtrey (a First and Third man from Cambridge)
     John Wingfield (Jesus College, Cambridge)
     David Neal (Henley R.C.)
     Hugh Cochrane (Reading R.C.)
     David Mayers stroke (Shrewsbury and Clare College, Cambridge)
     J Hooper (Marlow R.C.) as cox

One of the earliest crews to enter for the World Veteran Rowing Championships (the World Masters Regatta) was a coxless four from Upper Thames comprising Peter Sutherland, Sid Rand, Derek Thurgood and Glynne Davies in the early 1970s.

A number of renowned oarsmen have passed through the club membership, including many World and Olympic medalists. In 2014 two crews won the club's first trophies at Henley. They were:

The Wyfold Challenge Cup
     Ed Couldwell
     Michael Nagi
     Joe Perry
     Lewis Beech

The Britannia Challenge Cup
     Luke Wootton
     Graham Hall
     Sam Barnes
     Jake Davidson
     Scott Smith (cox).

Honours

British champions

See also
Rowing on the River Thames

References

External links 
Upper Thames Rowing Club official web site

Sports clubs established in 1963
Rowing clubs of the River Thames
Rowing in Berkshire
Sports clubs in Berkshire